156 Regiment RLC is an Army Reserve Regiment of the British Army's Royal Logistic Corps.

History
The Regiment was first formed in the Royal Corps of Transport as 156th (Lancashire and Cheshire) Regiment, RCT (Volunteers) in 1967. 238 Squadron was formed in 1969 and the regiment was renamed as 156th (Merseyside and Greater Manchester) Transport Regiment, RCT (Volunteers) in 1980 and 156th (North West) Transport Regiment, RLC (Volunteers) in 1993.

156 Transport Regiment was re-rolled in 2014 and is now a Supply Regiment within 101 Logistics Brigade.

Structure
The current structure is as follows:
 Regimental Headquarters and 235 Headquarters Squadron, in Liverpool
 234 (Wirral) Supply Squadron, in Oxton
 236 (Manchester) Supply Squadron, in Salford, Manchester
 Manx Troop, in Douglas, Isle of Man
 238 (Sefton) Supply Squadron, in Bootle
 381 (Lancaster) Supply Squadron, at Alexandra Barracks, Lancaster

References

External links
Official site

Regiments of the Royal Logistic Corps